Hitzig is the last name of:

 Eduard Hitzig (1838–1907), German brain scientist
 Ferdinand Hitzig (1807–1875), German Protestant theologian
 Friedrich Hitzig (1811–1881), German Jewish architect
 Julius Eduard Hitzig (1780 - 1849), German jurist and publisher. 

Jewish surnames
German-language surnames
Hebrew-language surnames